Garfield Township is a township in Plymouth County, Iowa in the United States that split from Elkhorn Township on September 6, 1882. The township is named after President James A. Garfield. Kingsley, Iowa is located within the township.

References

Townships in Iowa
1882 establishments in Iowa
Populated places established in 1882